The City of Fairfax, colloquially known as Fairfax City, Downtown Fairfax, Old Town Fairfax, Fairfax Courthouse, FFX, or simply Fairfax, is an independent city in the Commonwealth of Virginia in the United States. At the 2010 census the population was 22,565, which had risen to 24,146 at the 2020 census.

The City of Fairfax is an enclave surrounded by the separate political entity Fairfax County. Fairfax City also contains an exclave of Fairfax County, the Fairfax County Court Complex.

The City of Fairfax and the area immediately surrounding the historical border of the City of Fairfax, collectively designated by Fairfax County as "Fairfax", comprise the county seat of Fairfax County. The city is part of the Washington metropolitan area as well as a part of Northern Virginia. CUE Bus and Metrobus operate in Fairfax. Virginia Railway Express's Burke Centre station is situated three miles southeast of the city's boundaries. Virginia's largest public educational institution with 35,189 students in 2017 is George Mason University, which is located in unincorporated Fairfax County, along the city's southern border while still having a City of Fairfax address and sharing the same public transportation system.

History

Fairfax was founded on land originally occupied by indigenous people of the Siouan and Iroquoian tribes. The city derives its name from Thomas Fairfax, 6th Lord Fairfax of Cameron, who was awarded  of land in northern Virginia by King Charles. The area that the city now encompasses was settled in the early 18th century by farmers from Virginia's Tidewater region. The town of "Providence" was established on the site by an act of the state legislature in 1805.

The scene of the first land battle of the Civil War, the Battle of Fairfax Court House took place here on June 1, 1861, after a Union scouting party clashed with the local militia with neither side gaining advantage. A second battle took place here two years later on June 27, 1863, where Union troops were defeated. This battle delayed the movements of Confederate cavalry chief Jeb Stuart with disastrous consequences for Lee at Gettysburg a few days later.

Fairfax was officially renamed the "Town of Fairfax" in 1859. It was incorporated as a town in 1874. It was incorporated as a city in 1961 by court order. Under Virginia law the city was separated from Fairfax County yet remains the county seat. In 1904, a trolley line connected Fairfax with Washington, D.C.

Architecture

The former Fairfax County Courthouse is the oldest historic building in Fairfax. The first Fairfax courthouse was established in 1742 near present-day Tysons Corner, and is the namesake for Old Courthouse Road. It intersects with Gallows Road, which today is a major commuter route, but at the time was the road where condemned prisoners were led to the gallows at the old courthouse. In 1752, the courthouse was moved to Alexandria, which offered to build the new courthouse at their own expense. The reason the courthouse was moved from the Tysons Corner location was because of "Indian hostilities", as noted on the stone marker at the northwest corner of Gallows Road and Route 123.  The courthouse operated there until 1790, when Virginia ceded the land where the courthouse was located for the creation of Washington, DC. The General Assembly specified that the new courthouse should be located in the center of the county, and was established at the corner of what was Old Little River Turnpike and is now Main Street and what was Ox Road and is now Chain Bridge Road on land donated by town founder Richard Ratcliffe. The courthouse changed hands repeatedly during the Civil War, and the first Confederate officer battle casualty, John Quincy Marr, occurred on its grounds. The first meeting of the Fairfax Court was held April 21, 1800.

The oldest two-story building in the city, the Fairfax Public School was built in 1873 for $2,750. In addition to elementary school use the building has also housed special education, adult education, and police academy training. On July 4, 1992, the building became the Fairfax Museum and Visitor Center. Joseph Edward Willard built the town hall building in 1900 then gifted it to the then town in 1902.  The Old Town Hall now houses the Huddleston Library and the Fairfax Art League.

Sites on the National Register of Historic Places

Geography

The city of Fairfax is located close to the geographic center of Fairfax County, at  (38.852612, −77.304377).

While the city is the county seat, a small portion of the county comprising the courthouse complex, the jail and a small area nearby is itself an exclave of the county within the city. Fairfax County's Government Center is west of the City of Fairfax.

Demographics

2020 census

Note: the US Census treats Hispanic/Latino as an ethnic category. This table excludes Latinos from the racial categories and assigns them to a separate category. Hispanics/Latinos can be of any race.

2010 Census

As of the census of 2010, there were 22,565 people, 8,347 households, and 5,545 families residing in the city. The racial makeup of the city was 69.6% White, 15.2% Asian, 4.7% Black or African American, 0.5% Native American, 0.1% Pacific Islander, 5.9% from other races, and 4.0% from two or more races.  15.8% of the population were Hispanic or Latino of any race.

In 2000, there were 8,347 households, out of which 28.2% had children under the age of 18 living with them, 53.1% were married couples living together, 9.6% had a female householder with no husband present, and 33.6% were non-families. 24.0% of all households were made up of individuals, and 8.4% had someone living alone who was 65 years of age or older.  The average household size was 2.64 and the average family size was 3.11.

In the city, the population was spread out, with 20.4% under the age of 18, 10.2% from 18 to 24, 36.2% from 25 to 44, 27.6% from 45 to 64, and 13.6% who were 65 years of age or older.  The median age was 39.1 years. For every 100 females, there were 97.2 males.  For every 100 females age 18 and over, there were 95.6 males.

The median income for a household in the city was $67,642, and the median income for a family was $78,921 (these figures had risen to $93,441 and $105,046 respectively as of a 2007 estimate). Males had a median income of $50,348 versus $38,351 for females. The per capita income for the city was $31,247.  About 2.4% of families and 5.7% of the population were below the poverty line, including 4.3% of those under age 18 and 2.1% of those age 65 or over.

Economy
Old Town Fairfax has undergone an extensive redevelopment, which began in 2005.

In May 2009, Fairfax was rated as No. 3 in the "Top 25 Places to Live Well" by Forbes Magazine. Forbes commended Fairfax for its strong public school system, high median salary, and a rate of sole proprietors per capita that ranks it in the top 1 percent nationwide. According to the magazine, "These factors are increasingly important in a recession. When businesses and jobs retract, as they have nationwide, municipalities with strong environments for start-ups, and those that offer attractive amenities, are better suited to recover from economic downtimes, as there are more business activity filling the void."

Top employers
According to the city's 2022 Annual Comprehensive Financial Report, the top employers in the city are:

Annual events

 Chocolate Lovers Festival
The annual Chocolate Lover's Festival is held in the heart of Old Town Fairfax during the first full weekend in February. Events have included craft shows, historic building open houses, children's activities, collections of vendors selling various edible chocolate products, and even chocolate sculpture contests.
 Fairfax Civil War Day
Every year, during the Spring, a Civil War re-enactment camp is held at the Blenheim estate, a city-owned historical property. The encampment features cultural information about Civil War-era people and practices, military muster, drill, and a firing demonstration.
 Fairfax Spotlight on the Arts
Each April, the City of Fairfax, in cooperation with George Mason University, Northern Virginia Community College and City of Fairfax schools, sponsors the Fairfax Spotlight on the Arts Festival.  The festival runs for three weeks and features music, dance, theater, art and choral concerts. Events take place at venues throughout the city and the colleges.
 National Trails Day
In June, a National Trails Day is held to celebrate the trails, open spaces and parks in the City of Fairfax.
 Independence Day Celebration Parade and Evening Show
The largest hometown parade and fireworks celebration in the Washington metropolitan region is held in the City of Fairfax. The day's events include a parade through Old Town Fairfax, tours of historic buildings and local museums, an Old Fashioned Fireman's Day at the Fire Station #3, and a live concert and fireworks display at Fairfax High School.
 Irish Festival
In September, a festival of Irish and Celtic song, dance and music is held in and around Old Town Fairfax.
 Fall for the Book Festival
Each fall, the Fall for the Book Festival features readings, discussions, lectures and exhibits from nationally recognized writers and professionals. Festival events are held in the City of Fairfax, at George Mason University, and throughout the metropolitan Washington region. Two community reading programs coordinate with Fall for the Book: "All Fairfax Reads," coordinated by the  Fairfax County Public Library, and "Mason Reads" at George Mason University.
 Fall Festival
A Fall Festival is held in historic Old Town Fairfax on the second Saturday in October. This event includes more than 500 arts, crafts, and food vendors, and is usually held outdoors on the streets of the city. Attendance is about 35,000 to 45,000.
 The Holiday Craft Show
An annual Holiday Craft Show is held at Fairfax High School on the third Saturday and Sunday of November. The event features hundreds of craft vendors. Attendance is about 8,000 to 10,000.
 Festival of Lights & Carols
On the first Saturday in December, the city holds a Festival of Lights and Carols. Activities include photos with Santa, caroling, a yule log, hot mulled cider, illumination of Old Town Fairfax, and the lighting of the city Christmas tree.

Local government and politics
As an independent city of Virginia rather than an incorporated town within a county, Fairfax derives its governing authority from the Virginia General Assembly. In order to revise the power and structure of the city government, the city must request the General Assembly to amend the charter. The present charter was granted in 1966. An exclave of Fairfax County is located within the City of Fairfax.

Elected officials 
In November on even-numbered years, city voters elect a Mayor, six at-large Councilmembers, and five at-large School Board members to serve two-year terms. These offices are non-partisan and at-large, and there are no term limits.  City voters also elect the two city constitutional officers: Treasurer and Commissioner of the Revenue for four-year terms. Other elected officials who serve the city elected by city and Fairfax County voters include the Sheriff (four-year term), Commonwealth's Attorney (four-year term), and Clerk of the Court (eight-year term). State elected officials who represent the City of Fairfax include the Virginia Governor, Lieutenant Governor, Attorney General, Virginia Senator (34th District), and Virginia Delegate (37th District). Starting with the 2023 election, the city will lie within the 37th Virginia Senate district and the 11th House of Delegates district. Federal elected officials who represent the City of Fairfax include the U.S. President, U.S. Vice President, two U.S. Senators (six-year terms), and one U.S. Representative, 11th District (two-year term).

Mayor arrested for distribution of methamphetamine
On August 4, 2016, then-Mayor Scott Silverthorne was arrested in a sting operation conducted by the Fairfax County Police Department. After receiving a tip that he was involved in drugs-related activities online, a police detective engaged Silverthorne on an online website "...used to arrange for casual sexual encounters between men." The detective then arranged a meeting with Silverthorne and two other men, in which they agreed to exchange methamphetamine. At the meeting in Tyson's Corner, Virginia, detectives performed the exchange and then arrested Silverthorne along with the two other men. He was charged with felony distribution of methamphetamine and misdemeanor possession of drug paraphernalia. He announced his resignation on Monday, August 8, 2016, in a letter to the City Council.
Despite news media seizing the salacious "drugs-for-sex" aspect of the story, Silverthorne maintains that he was not distributing methamphetamine "for sex," and he was not tried for any sexual crimes.

Education

Primary and secondary schools

The school district for the city is Fairfax City Public Schools. The public schools in the City of Fairfax are owned by the city, but administered by the Fairfax County Public Schools (FCPS) system under contractual agreement with Fairfax County. This arrangement began to be in place in 1961. U.S. News & World Report often ranks Fairfax County schools among the best in the country. City of Fairfax schools are Fairfax High School, Lanier Middle School, Daniels Run Elementary School, Providence Elementary School, and Fairfax Academy.

Schools within the city that are not owned by the city government include the Boyd School, Gesher Jewish Day School, Kellar School of Inova Kellar Center, Lee Highway KinderCare, Little Flock Christian School, Northern Virginia Christian Academy, Oak Valley Center, Paul VI Catholic High School (moved in 2020-2021), The Salvation Army University View Child Care Center, Saint Leo The Great School, Trinity Christian School, and Truro Preschool & Kindergarten.

Colleges and universities
George Mason University, the largest university in the Commonwealth of Virginia, is located just to the south of the Fairfax city limits. Mason began as an extension of the University of Virginia in 1949 named the Northern Virginia University Center of the University of Virginia. The Town of Fairfax purchased  for the university in 1958, though the property remained within the county when the town became a city. After several name changes in 1972 the institution became George Mason University. Mason is most known for its programs in economics, law, creative writing, computer science, and business. In recent years, George Mason faculty have twice won the Nobel Prize in Economics. The university enrolls 33,917 students, making it the largest university by head count in the Commonwealth of Virginia.

Public libraries
Fairfax County Public Library operates the City of Fairfax Regional Library in Fairfax. The library includes the Virginia Room, a collection of books, photographs, and manuscripts related to Fairfax County history, government, and genealogy.

Sports

Rugby League
The Fairfax Eagles rugby league team plays in the American National Rugby League.

Infrastructure

Roads

The intersection of U.S. Route 50 and U.S. Route 29 is located in the northeast corner of the city. The two major highways join to form Fairfax Boulevard for approximately  through the city before separating. State Route 123, State Route 236 and State Route 237 pass through the city. SR 236 is named Main Street in the city and then becomes Little River Turnpike once the city line is crossed. Interstate 66 passes just outside the city limits and is the major highway serving the Fairfax region. Connections to I-66 from the city can be made via U.S. Route 50 and State Route 123.

Public transportation

Rail
Although these stations are located outside city limits, trips to and from Fairfax are served by:
 The Vienna station of the Washington Metro
 The Burke Centre station of Virginia Railway Express and Amtrak

Bus
 The City of Fairfax operates the CUE Bus, an independent bus network.
 Multiple routes of the Washington Metrobus serve Fairfax, as does the Fairfax Connector Route 306.

E-Scooters and Dockless Mobility 
 In February 2019, the city has launched a one-year pilot program for e-scooters and other dockless transportation. Three micro-mobility companies have been chosen to run the pilot, Bird company alongside Lime and Spin.

Notable people

 Adam Birch, former WWE professional wrestler known as Joey Mercury; born in Fairfax
 Bobby (Kim Ji-Won), rapper in popular South Korean pop group iKon
 Sam Champion (raised in Fairfax and a graduate of Fairfax High School), weather anchor of ABC's Good Morning America and weather editor of ABC News
 Serena Deeb, former WWE professional wrestler; born in Fairfax
 Lewis J. Fields, United States Marine Corps Lieutenant general, lived in Fairfax following his retirement from military.
 Victor Gold, journalist and political consultant who resided in Fairfax.
 Will "Meteos" Hartman, League of Legends player for Cloud9 and Phoenix1, born in Massachusetts and raised in Fairfax
 Christina Hendricks, actress, went to high school in Fairfax
 Joseph R. Jelinek, United States Army brigadier general, lived in Fairfax while serving as Deputy Director of the Army National Guard
 Courtney Jines, actress
 Lamar Johnstone (1886–1919), silent film actor
 Brian Kendrick, WWE wrestler, born in Fairfax
 Sabrina Lloyd, actress on the TV series Sliders and Sports Night, born in Fairfax
 Jay Matternes, paleoartist
 TobyMac, award-winning Christian singer/songwriter
 Lorenzo Odone, subject of the 1992 film Lorenzo's Oil
 Jeremy Olander, Swedish DJ and electronic music producer, born in Fairfax
 Park Yu-hwan, South Korean-born actor, and brother of Yoochun; raised in Fairfax.
 Aldric Saucier, scientist and whistleblower.
 Mike Schleibaum, band Darkest Hour founding member and guitarist, born in Fairfax
 Michael Schwimer, Major League Baseball player
 Nathan Sonenshein, rear admiral
 Frank Stephens, disability advocate, actor and athlete
 Victoria Stiles, makeup artist
 Jason Sudeikis, actor and comedian, formerly a cast member of Saturday Night Live
 Pierre Thuot, Space Shuttle astronaut aboard Atlantis, Endeavour, and Columbia, raised in Fairfax and graduated from Fairfax High School
 Matt Tifft, NASCAR driver
 Jarvis Varnado, former NBA player
 Yoochun, South Korean-born actor, member of pop band JYJ, and former member of TVXQ; raised in Fairfax

 Philip, Hereditary Prince of Yugoslavia
 Prince Alexander of Yugoslavia (born 1982)

See also

 Fairfax County, Virginia
 List of Famous People from the Washington Metropolitan Area
 National Register of Historic Places in Fairfax, Virginia

Notes

References

 
Cities in Virginia
Washington metropolitan area
County seats in Virginia
Populated places established in 1805
1805 establishments in Virginia